The men's 73 kg judo competition at the 2012 Summer Paralympics was held on 31 August at ExCeL London.

Results

Gold Medal Contest

Bronze Medal Contest

Contest A

Contest B

Table Contest

Table A

Table B

References

External links
 

M73
Judo at the Summer Paralympics Men's Lightweight